Pre-mRNA-splicing factor RBM22 is a protein that in humans is encoded by the RBM22 gene.

References

Further reading